Ffion Llywelyn Hague, Baroness Hague of Richmond (née Jenkins; 21 February 1968) is a Welsh broadcaster, author, former civil servant, and wife of Conservative politician William Hague. Born Ffion Jenkins in Cardiff, she is a native Welsh speaker and first became known when she was selected to teach the language to her future husband when he was Secretary of State for Wales.

She is the younger sister of Manon Antoniazzi, who served as the assistant private secretary to Prince Charles and is now Chief Executive and Clerk of the Senedd.

Early life 
She attended Ysgol Gyfun Gymraeg Glantaf, a Welsh-language comprehensive school in Cardiff, and went on to study English at Jesus College, Oxford. After graduating she joined the civil service. She played the clarinet in the National Youth Orchestra of Wales and sang in the National Youth Choir.

Personal life 
She met William Hague in 1995, when she became his private secretary at the Welsh Office. Because of the embarrassment caused by the previous Welsh secretary John Redwood, who was unable to sing the Welsh national anthem, it was decided that his successor should learn the words.

They were married on 19 December 1997, at the Palace of Westminster, and currently reside in Richmond, North Yorkshire. When her husband was raised to the peerage in 2015 as Baron Hague of Richmond she became The Lady Hague of Richmond. William Hague disclosed in September 2010 that she had suffered a number of miscarriages as they tried to start a family. They do not have any children.

Career  
Hague was a director of The Outward Bound Trust from 1 April 2009 until 7 December 2012. She was a director of Hanson Green, an executive recruitment firm from 11 December 2003, until it merged with Directorbank on 1 February 2008. Previously, she had been a director of The Voices Foundation from 23 September 1998, until she resigned on 12 July 2005.

Hague is also a published author best known for her biography of David Lloyd George, entitled The Pain and the Privilege: The Women in Lloyd George's Life. For S4C, she presented the series Mamwlad (2012), Tri Lle (2010) and Dwy Wraig Lloyd George (2009). She has also presented programmes for BBC Radio 3 and BBC Radio 4.

References

External links 
Official website

1968 births
Living people
Welsh biographers
People educated at Ysgol Gyfun Gymraeg Glantaf
Alumni of Jesus College, Oxford
Welsh civil servants
Welsh women in business
Welsh-language television presenters
Welsh radio presenters
BBC Radio 3 presenters
BBC Radio 4 presenters
Welsh television executives
British women radio presenters
Spouses of life peers